Full-forward is a position in Australian rules football and Gaelic football with a key focus on kicking goals.

The Coleman Medal is awarded to the player, often a full-forward, who has kicked the most goals in an Australian Football League season.

In modern Australian rules football and Gaelic football, in which players do not strictly stick to a single position, the full-forward is often referred to as a "Key Forward" and can often switch positions with the centre half-forward for "team balance" reasons.  The frequency of players kicking 100 goals in a season has decreased in recent years.in Gaelic Football, goals don’t come to often with an average of 1 goal per game in a single match.

Notable full-forwards

Present

 Ben Brown
 Jeremy Cameron
 Lance Franklin
 Tom Hawkins
 Josh Kennedy
 Jack Riewoldt
 Taylor Walker

Past great full-forwards
These are the more notable full-forwards who played in the AFL, SANFL, WAFL and TFL:
 Gary Ablett, Sr.
 Malcolm Blight
 Bonny Campbell
 John Coleman
 Fred Cook
 Gordon Coventry
 Rick Davies
 George Doig
 Jason Dunstall
 Tim Evans
 Ken Farmer
 Brendan Fevola
 Fraser Gehrig
 Barry Hall
 Scott Hodges
 Peter Hudson
 Dick Lee
 Matthew Lloyd
 Tony Lockett
 John Longmire
 Alastair Lynch
 Peter McKenna
 Jim "Frosty" Miller
 Tony Modra
 Bernie Naylor
 Matthew Pavlich
 Fred Phillis
 Bob Pratt
 Rino Pretto
 Alan Rait
 Matthew Richardson
 Michael Roach
 Austin Robertson, Jr.
 Anthony Rocca
 Saverio Rocca
 Bruce Schultz
 Jamie Shaw
 Norm Smith
 Peter Sumich
 Jack Titus
 Doug Wade

Field Positions

References

Australian rules football terminology
Gaelic games terminology